Ben McLaughlin (born September 22, 1986) is a former quarterback and Hall of Fame inductee for the Louisiana College Wildcats football team, the Louisiana Swashbucklers of the Southern Indoor Football League, and the 2011 Gold Medal winning United States national American football team.

High school
McLaughlin was the starting quarterback for the Dierks High School Outlaws. He was a two-time All-state football player, and a three-sport athlete. He became the starter during his sophomore year in 2002, and led his team to an undefeated season in 2004, losing a close game in the Arkansas state playoffs to finish with an 11-1 season record. A favorite Outlaw memory will always be the Dierks/Murfreesboro game of 2002 where Ben led his team back from a 7-point deficit with 32 seconds remaining. He then connected on a 2-point conversion that resulted in Dierks beating Murfreesboro, breaking a seven-year losing drought.

College

2005
McLaughlin redshirted for 2005 while attending Henderson State University. He transferred the next year to Louisiana College in Pineville, Louisiana where he felt he had a better opportunity.

2006
As a red-shirt freshman at LC, Benjamin took over the reins as starting quarterback and never looked back. He finished the year leading the American Southwest Conference in passing offense, averaging 276 yards through the air. McLaughlin ranked second in the ASC and 12th nationally in total offense per game. He completed 185-of-316 passes with 21 touchdowns and only seven interceptions. McLaughlin was named the American Southwest Conference freshman of the year.

2007
Once again, McLaughlin posted strong numbers for the Wildcat football team. The LC passing offense finished the season ranked fifth for NCAA Division III offenses, averaging 325.7 yards per game.  Ben ranked eighth nationally in passing offense per game, averaging 297.8 yards per game. McLaughlin threw for a total of 2,978 yards and 21 touchdowns. Also, McLaughlin ranked 12th nationally in the category of total offense.

2008
After receiving a year-long suspension for violating team rules, Ben left Louisiana College for the year.

2009
The burning desire to finish what he started led to a lot of soul searching, and resulted in Ben returning to LC and rejoining the football team as a junior. McLaughlin picked up right where he left off completing a 56-yard TD pass for LC’s first score of the season.
He continued his assault on the LC record books, by establishing new marks for career passing yards, total touchdowns and passing touchdowns during his junior season. He also excelled in the classroom being named to the Academic All-Conference team. He was again recognized as the ASC Offensive Player of the Week during his junior year.

2010
Ben's senior year at QB with the Wildcats football team was when people outside of Pineville began to take notice. The recognition started with him being named ASC Offensive Player of the Week after throwing for 391 yards and four touchdowns, and ran for two more scores. Ben went 30-for-36 through the air without an interception. McLaughlin, whose TD runs both came from one yard out in the third quarter, accounted for all but one of LC’s seven touchdowns. Needing only 77 yards to become the ASC career passing leader, McLaughlin shattered the previous record with a 491-yard, six-touchdown performance in a 62-28 win over Howard Payne University. This performance also resulted in him being named to the D3Football.com Team of the Week. Ben finished the year leading all divisions of football with 3,770 yards passing and 42 touchdown passes. His passing yardage was over 700 yards more than anyone else in the country at all levels of football, while his TD total topped all others by seven. McLaughlin also added four rushing touchdowns in a year that saw the Wildcats go 7-3 overall and a program-record 7-1 in their conference.

Once the season ended, the regional and national awards began racking up. First came the ASC Offensive Player of the Year award, followed by a return to the Academic All-Conference team. McLaughlin was next selected as a Gagliardi Trophy finalist. The Gagliardi is one of two Division III (D3) player of the year awards. Next up was the 2010 D3Football.com All-South Region Team as the 1st team QB. The morning of the Gagliardi awards saw Ben being named to the 2010 Little All-America Team, by the Associated Press. Despite losing out on the Gagliardi trophy, Ben was named to the All-Louisiana College Football team by the Louisiana Sports Writers Association as 1st team QB, and was named the Offensive Player of the Year along with LSU's Patrick Peterson who was named Defensive Player of the Year. Ben wasn't done yet. He was then selected as the Division III Player of the Year when he was chosen as the recipient of the Melberger Award. In June, he was named the ASC Male Athlete of the Year, which encompasses all sports.  However, the highest honor paid to Ben was when Team USA came calling.

Statistics

Team USA
In 2011 McLaughlin accepted an offer to play for the US national team for the 2011 IFAF World Cup. The team went undefeated with wins over Canada, Mexico, Germany, and Australia. Ben's 64-yard TD pass in the game vs. Australia was the longest passing TD for the American team during the games. The American team won the gold medal on the night of July 16, 2011 on Tivoli Field in Innsbruck, Austria by defeating Canada 50-7. Team USA was the defending gold medalists having won the 2007 games played in Japan.

The schedule of travel for the games was an instant source of stress for Benjamin. He was recently engaged, and had a wedding date of July 8 already picked out. He and his fiancée Meagan agreed to move the wedding date up so that they could be in Austria for the games held July 8–16, 2011. The two were married in a private ceremony on April 22, 2011, and held a public reception on August 5 after they returned from a European honeymoon. Ben was also in the hunt for the SIFL championship as QB of an indoor football team from southwest Louisiana. However, the decision to represent his country on the world stage took precedence, and he left the Louisiana Swashbucklers to join Team USA in June 2011.

Statistics

Professional Indoor Football
Prior to joining Team USA, McLaughlin had been signed to play for the Louisiana Swashbucklers, a member of the Southern Indoor Football League. Ben guided the Swashbucklers to the playoffs where they lost to the Albany Panthers in the 2011 SIFL Championship Game. However, Ben had to leave the team prior to the championship game in order to join Team USA in Europe for the gold medal games. Ben's absence was felt in the fact that his Swashbucklers were outscored 41 points to 13, in the second half of the championship game.

Statistics

Hall of Fame
Ben was selected unanimously, during his first year of eligibility to be inducted into the Louisiana College Sports Hall of Fame. Athletic Director/Head coach Dennis Dunn, recognized Ben on his accomplishments at the 2015 Hall of Fame brunch as part of homecoming weekend activities on October 2, 2015.

Coaching
Since putting his playing days behind him, Ben entered into the world of college coaching. His first opportunity came in 2011 as running backs coach at his alma mater, Louisiana College. He then accepted the position of quarterbacks coach at Northeastern Oklahoma A&M College (NEO) in 2013. He was promoted to Offensive Coordinator at NEO for the 2014 season. McLaughlin served as quarterbacks coach and offensive coordinator at his alma mater Louisiana College from 2016-19. He served as the offensive coordinator and quarterbacks coach at Alexandria Senior High School (Louisiana) in Alexandria, LA from 2019-21, helping to lead them to a Class 5A State Runner-Up finish in 2020. He is currently the head football coach at Buckeye High School (Louisiana) in Deville, Louisiana.

Ben has also served as the head coach for the Dream Bowl. The Dream Bowl was started as an effort to provide opportunities for FCS, Division II and III athletes to showcase their talents for NFL scouts. His first year as head coach was for Dream Bowl V, played on Monday January 16, 2017 in Virginia Beach, Va. It was highest scoring contest in the game’s six-year history. Ben returned to coach the annual event and was the winning coach for Dream Bowl VI. Benjamin has also been an invited speaker at LSU's annual coaching clinic held in Baton Rouge, La.

Personal
Ben is married to Meagan Tison, and has two daughters. They currently reside in Alexandria, Louisiana. In 2012, Ben was diagnosed with having had Type 1 diabetes, making his football career all that more astonishing. Benjamin is the youngest of two brothers. Benjamin's parents, Jim and Donna McLaughlin, continue to reside in his hometown of Dierks, Arkansas.

References

External links
Melberger Award
College Football Reference
La. Offensive Player of the Year
All South Team
Gagliardi Finalist

1986 births
Living people
American football quarterbacks
Louisiana Christian Wildcats football players
People from Dierks, Arkansas
Louisiana Swashbucklers players